Blahnița may refer to several places in Romania:

Blahnița de Jos, a village in Târgu Cărbunești town, Gorj County
Blahnița de Sus, a village in Săcelu Commune, Gorj County
Blahnița (Danube), a river in Mehedinți County
Blahnița (Gilort), a river in Gorj County
Blahnița, a protected area in Gorj County